, also known as Saint Seiya: Knights of the Zodiac or simply Knights of the Zodiac (translated from the French title Les Chevaliers du Zodiaque), is a Japanese manga series written and illustrated by Masami Kurumada. It was serialized in Shueisha's shōnen manga magazine Weekly Shōnen Jump from 1986 to 1990, with its chapters collected in 28 tankōbon volumes. The story follows five mystical warriors called the Saints who fight wearing sacred sets of armor named "Cloths", the designs of which derive from the various constellations the characters have adopted as their destined guardian symbols, and empowered by a mystical energy called "Cosmo". The Saints have sworn to defend the reincarnation of the Greek goddess Athena in her battle against other Olympian gods who want to dominate Earth.

In North America, the manga was licensed for English release by Viz Media. Since 2006, Kurumada has been publishing a sequel manga titled Saint Seiya: Next Dimension. Several spin-off manga by different authors have also been created. The manga was adapted by Toei Animation into a 114-episode anime television series which was broadcast on TV Asahi and its affiliates from 1986 to 1989. Saint Seiya was later continued with three original video animations released from 2002 to 2008. Four animated feature films premiered in Japanese theaters from 1987 to 1989, with a fifth in 2004 and a sixth in 2014. The anime series was first licensed by DIC Entertainment (as Knights of the Zodiac) and ADV Films in 2003 and by Netflix in 2019. The first four films were released by Discotek Media. A live-action film adaptation is set to premiere in April 2023.

The Saint Seiya manga had over 50 million copies in circulation as of 2022, making it one of the best-selling manga series. Both the original manga and the anime adaptation were successful internationally across Asia, Europe, Africa and Latin America.

Plot

Upon awakening his , the power of the Saints which is an inner spiritual essence originated in the Big Bang, Seiya quickly becomes the Pegasus Saint and returns to Japan to find his older sister.

Because his sister disappeared the same day Seiya went to the Sanctuary, Saori Kido, the granddaughter of Mitsumasa Kido (the person who sent all the orphans to train) makes a deal with him to go to fight in a tournament called the Galaxian Wars. In this tournament, all the orphans who survived and became Bronze Saints must fight to win the most powerful Cloth: The Sagittarius Gold Cloth. If Seiya goes to compete there and wins, Saori would start a search to find Seiya's sister. The tournament is interrupted by the revengeful Phoenix Bronze Saint, Ikki, who wishes to eliminate track from the people who forced him to undergo his training. He steals parts from the Sagittarius Cloth and eventually fights against the remaining Bronze Saints: Seiya, Shun (Ikki's brother), Shiryū, and Hyōga.

Upon Ikki's defeat, the Bronze Saints are attacked by the Silver Saints sent by the Sanctuary's Pope to eliminate them. When they remain victorious, the Bronze Saints learn that Saori is Athena's reincarnation and that the Pope once tried to kill her as a baby. The Sagittarius Gold Saint Aiolos saved Saori but was killed shortly afterwards and gave Saori to her adopted grandfather, Mitsumasa Kido. Deciding to join forces with Saori, the Bronze Saints go to the Sanctuary to defeat the Pope, but upon their arrival, Saori is severely wounded by a gold arrow from a Silver Saint. Believing the Pope may be able to heal her, the Bronze Saints go to find him. To do so, they have to go through 12 temples, each one guarded by one Gold Saint (the most powerful Saints of Athena). Following several battles, Seiya gets to the Pope's temple and learns that he is the Gold Saint Gemini Saga, who in his madness killed the real Pope to obtain more power. With help from his friends' Cosmos, Seiya is able to knock out Saga and use the shield from Athena's statue to heal Saori. Shortly afterwards, Saga, having come to his senses, commits suicide as a self-punishment.

In the second story arc, the Greek god Poseidon reincarnates within the body of Julian Solo, the heir to a rich and powerful family, who follows his will of flooding the Earth. Saori goes to his Temple, where Julian offers her to reduce the flooding by absorbing the water inside the Oceans' Central Pillar. Following Saori, Seiya, Hyōga, Shun and Shiryū go to Poseidon's underwater Temple and are confronted by his underlings, the Marines. As Seiya, Hyōga, and Shiryū make their way to Julian, Ikki learns that the mastermind behind this war is Saga's twin, Gemini Kanon, who is manipulating Poseidon. During the final battle, Poseidon's spirit awakes within Julian and manages to defeat his opponents. Saved by the Saints from the Pillar, Saori seals Poseidon's soul within her amphora.

The third and last arc follows how Hades, the Underworld god, is freed from his seal and revives the deceased Gold Saints and the Pope Aries Shion, and alongside some of his 108 Specters, sends them to the Sanctuary to kill Athena. The remaining Gold Saints serving Athena are able to subdue the enemies, but Saori then commits suicide. This act is instead meant to directly send her to the Underworld to face Hades, and the Bronze Saints follow her. Shion reveals that the revived Gold Saints' true intentions were of giving Saori her own Cloth, and gives it to Seiya's group before dying once again. In the Underworld, as the Saints fight Hades' Specters, Shun is possessed by Hades. Saori reaches Hades and expels his soul from Shun's body. Hades then takes Saori to Elysium, and the five Bronze Saints follow them. In the final fight against Hades and his two followers, Hypnos and Thanatos, the Saints gain the strongest God Cloths and use them to aid Saori in defeating Hades. However, Seiya also sacrifices himself by receiving one of Hades' attacks, and the Saints return to Earth with his body.

Production
At first, Kurumada planned to create a wrestling-themed manga as he enjoys writing individual sports rather than collective sports. He was initially inspired by The Karate Kid (1984) to conceive a story about a young karateka named Seiya found by a karate master and his female assistant; however, his publishing department did not approve the idea. Since he thought simple sports like judo or karate would not be interesting enough, he added aspects from Greek mythology and constellations to make it innovative. However, the basic concept of Saint Seiya was to be a nekketsu manga with a "fashion" touch added by the Saint Cloths. After the quick cancellation of his previous work, Otoko Zaka, in 1984, this "fashion sense" was something Kurumada thought would be an aspect that would attract fans, making it different from his previous manga with simple high school uniforms. Although they look like European medieval armors, Kurumada said his main inspiration for the Cloths was Hajime Sorayama's 1983 illustration book Sexy Robot. Besides from fashion, the Cloths were created because Kurumada wanted characters to throw explosive sparks and the armors was a way to give them some protection. Initially, he could not decide what type of armor it would be, considering even Buddhist kasaya; based on the Greek motif, he designed the actual Saint Cloths.

When Kurumada was in the process of creating Saint Seiya, he gave Seiya the name Rin at first, since Kurumada was going to title his manga "Ginga no Rin" (Rin of the Galaxy). However, as Kurumada continued developing his manga, he decided to change the name to Seiya, which was more fitting. First he spelled the name with the kanji that meant "Holy Arrow", to relate it to Seiya's condition as a Saint, but later decided to use the kanji that meant "Star Arrow", to emphasize the constellation and mythological motif. Finally, he changed his manga title as well, to Saint Seiya, once he fully developed the concept of the Saints. Also, Kurumada stated that one of the first ideas he conceived for Saint Seiya was the Pegasus Meteor Fist. Since his manga was going to use the constellations as a very important and ever-present theme, he wanted his protagonist to have a special move that would be like a shower of meteors.

When Kurumada designed Seiya's likeness, he was inspired by his character Ryūji Takane, the protagonist of his hit manga Ring ni Kakero, which he created 9 years before Seiya. Most protagonists of Kurumada's works bear a resemblance to Ryūji, as Kurumada subscribes to the revered Osamu Tezuka's Star System (a stable cast of characters) technique. The same process is done with almost all the other characters from the series. After creating Seiya as a nekketsu character, he decided to give different personality traits to each of other main characters: Shiryū is the "righteous and serious"; Hyoga is "posed and classy"; Shun is the "lovable boy"; and Ikki is the lone wolf.

Media

Manga

Written and illustrated by Masami Kurumada, Saint Seiya was serialized in Shueisha's shōnen manga magazine Weekly Shōnen Jump from January 1, 1986, to November 19, 1990. The last chapter was published in the first issue of V Jump (released as an extra edition of Weekly Shōnen Jump) on December 12, 1990. Shueisha collected its 110 individual chapters in twenty-eight tankōbon volumes, released from September 10, 1986, to April 10, 1991. Shueisha has also released the series in other editions; fifteen aizōban volumes, from November 20, 1995, to January 20, 1997; fifteen bunkoban volumes, from January 18 to August 10, 2001; twenty-two kanzenban volumes, from December 2, 2005, to October 4, 2006. Akita Shoten is releasing the series in a shinsōban edition since June 8, 2021. As of July 8, 2021, five volumes have been released.

In North America, the series was licensed for English release by Viz Media in 2003. Under the title Saint Seiya: Knights of the Zodiac, Viz Media released its twenty-eight volumes from January 21, 2004, to February 2, 2010.

Kurumada published in Akita Shoten's Champion Red a series of special in-depth chapters of events from the manga; Saint Seiya: Episode Zero, from December 19, 2017, to February 19, 2018. Saint Seiya Origin, from December 19, 2018, to January 19, 2019; and Saint Seiya: Destiny, on December 19, 2018. The three chapters of Episode Zero were included in the first volume of the series' shinsōban edition.

Other series

A spin-off series by Megumu Okada, titled Saint Seiya Episode.G, was serialized in Akita Shoten's Champion Red from December 19, 2002, to June 19, 2013.

Kurumada started a sequel to Saint Seiya, titled Saint Seiya: Next Dimension, in 2006. A prologue chapter was published in Akita Shoten's Weekly Shōnen Champion on April 27, 2006, and the series officially debuted in the magazine on August 23 of the same year. The collected volumes are published in full color.

A second spin-off series by Shiori Teshirogi, titled Saint Seiya: The Lost Canvas, was serialized in Weekly Shōnen Champion from August 24, 2006, to April 7, 2013.

A third spin-off series by Chimaki Kuori Saint Seiya: Saintia Shō, was serialized in Champion Red from August 19, 2013, to July 19, 2021.

A fourth spin-off series by Kenji Saito and Shinshu Ueda, titled , started in Champion Red on December 19, 2020. Its first volume was released on June 18, 2021.

A fifth spin-off manga series by Tsunaki Suda, titled , started serialization in Champion Red on September 16, 2022.

Anime

Overview 
TV and OVA series

Animated movies

Release
An anime adaptation of Saint Seiya was first proposed in June 1986 three months before the first manga volume was published. After Toei Animation started a partnership with TV Asahi, they looked for sponsors. Bandai got interested in selling the Saint Cloths as merchandise so it began development. Masayoshi Kawata, producer of TV Asahi, thought Saint Seiya was the perfect fit for the "hero show" they were looking for. By July, scriptwriter Takao Koyama had written the first episode scheduled to be broadcast in October. Since an episode adapts several chapters the anime goes faster than the manga, which led the TV series staff to create some original stories to fill the gap. The anime adaptation was broadcast on TV Asahi from October 11, 1986, to April 1, 1989. It was directed first by Kōzō Morishita (episodes 1–73) and then by Kazuhito Kikuchi (episodes 74–114). The character designers and aestheticists were Shingo Araki and Michi Himeno, and Seiji Yokoyama composed the soundtracks. Following Kurumada's storylines from the manga closely, the chief scriptwriters were Takao Koyama (1–73) and Yoshiyuki Suga (74–114). The series has three main parts: Sanctuary (episodes 1–73), Asgard, an anime original story arc (episodes 74–99), and Poseidon (episodes 100–114). The series was cancelled and left unfinished in 1989, leaving one arc of the manga not animated, until finally being adapted into a series of OVAs in 2002. The series one-hundred fourteen episodes was re-released in Japan on two Blu-ray box sets on June 20 and September 24, 2014. The series was re-broadcast on TV Asahi in 2015.

After Japan, Saint Seiya was first broadcast in France in 1988 on TF1's , under the title Les Chevaliers du Zodiaque (which inspired the title in other language versions), and the series became quickly popular. The series was broadcast throughout Asia, Europe and Latin America, where it was a success as well. In North America, the series was first licensed by DIC Entertainment, under the title Knights of the Zodiac, in 2003. The DIC version was edited for broadcast, cutting overly violent scenes, coloring the red blood to blue, adding in previously non-existent digital scene transitions, rewriting the scripts, renaming several characters and replacing the music themes and the original soundtrack. This version premiered in the United States on Cartoon Network on August 30, 2003, and in Canada on YTV on September 5 of the same year. Unlike other territories, Saint Seiya did not succeed in North America, and DIC only dubbed forty episodes. ADV Films licensed the home video rights to the series. They released the DIC-edited version and an uncut version of the show with English subtitles, which also included a new dub (with a different voice cast than the one used by DIC). ADV Films released the first twenty-eight episodes of the edited version on seven (of the planned twelve) DVDs from January 27 to October 25, 2004, and released only sixty episodes of the uncut version on twelve DVDs from October 21, 2003, May 31, 2005. A box-set collection was released on January 13, 2009. New Video released the first seventy-three episodes on a subtitle-only DVD set, titled Saint Seiya: Sanctuary Classic Complete Collection, on April 15, 2014. On October 15, 2019, Netflix began streaming a third English dub, featuring the cast from Knights of the Zodiac: Saint Seiya; the first fifteen episodes premiered first and episodes 16–41 were added some days later; episodes 42 to 73 were added in January 2020; and episodes 74 to 114 were added in April 2020, in effect making the Netflix dub the only complete English dub of the entire original series. The series was removed from the platform in December 2021.

A spin-off television series, Saint Seiya Omega, was broadcast for ninety-seven episodes on TV Asahi from April 1, 2012, to March 30, 2014.

Novels

On November 9, 1988, Weekly Shōnen Jump released a Jump Gold Selection Anime Special 2, written by Takao Koyama, with illustrations by the series' animation character designers Shingo Araki and Michi Himeno. This special is just a detailed flashback to Gemini Saga's assassination attempt on the newborn Athena.

There is also a series of two light novels by Tatsuya Hamazaki with the name of Saint Seiya: Gigantomachia, which were published by Jump J-Books. The first novel was released in Japan on August 23, 2002, while the second was released on December 16, 2002.

Films

Four animated feature films were shown in Japanese theaters from 1987 to 1989. A fifth animated film came out in Japanese theaters in 2004, which was supposed to follow the regular chronology right after the end of the manga (which finished being adapted on August 1, 2008) as a prologue to a new chapter. Toei Animation first announced that this new chapter would be a new animated series, but later Kurumada stated that he wanted the film to be part of a trilogy. Tōru Furuya revealed Kurumada's wishes for the series during a press conference. After Pegasus Seiya eventually defeats Zeus, he is to go on and face Chronos, the God of Time. Toru was not allowed to say anything more. With the serialization of Saint Seiya: Next Dimension, Kurumada removed Overture from the canon of the Saint Seiya universe, although some elements that appeared in it remain in the continuity.

Despite the first movie being released in 1987, none of the movies received an official English release in North America until it was announced by Discotek in 2012 that they had acquired the home video rights to the first four movies and intended to release them across two DVDs, each containing two movies. The DVDs contain Japanese audio with English subtitles.

In 2003, the French magazine AnimeLand published an interview with Masami Kurumada where the author revealed that a company in Hollywood had approached him some years prior with a fifteen-minute pilot of a live-action movie of Saint Seiya. The project was abandoned as Kurumada did not feel the essence of the series had been preserved. In a later interview published in 2005 the reporter was allowed to see the video and commented on how the names of the main characters were changed and noted that one of them, Andromeda Shun had been changed from male to female.

On June 21, 2014, Legend of Sanctuary was released. Animated in CGI, Legend of Sanctuary is based on the classic 1986 series. It was produced by Toei to celebrate the 25th anniversary of the franchise.

In 2017, a collaboration between Toei Animation and Hong Kong-based production company A Really Good Film Company was announced. In the press conference, plans for a live-action Saint Seiya movie were detailed, and Polish director Tomasz Bagiński was announced as being in charge of filming, based on the classic 1986 series, which was supposed to take place in Summer 2019. On September 21, 2021, The Hollywood Reporter revealed that the film will star Mackenyu as Seiya, Madison Iseman as Sienna, Sean Bean as Alman Kiddo and Diego Tinoco as a man hired to kill the vulnerable goddess. Famke Janssen, Nick Stahl and Mark Dacascos are also cast in the film. Filming will take place in Hungary and Croatia. The film is set to premiere in Japan on April 28, 2023. Sony Pictures is distributing the film outside Japan, except in China and the Middle East, and is set to premiere in 2023.

Original video animations

These are a series of original video animations (OVAs) that cover the last arc of the manga, which was not previously adapted into anime. The first 13 episodes were broadcast on Animax (a Japanese pay-per-view channel) from November 9, 2002, to April 12, 2003, and then released on DVD during the year 2003. These 13 episodes were named  and adapt volumes 19 to 22 of the manga. This OVA series was directed by Shigeyasu Yamauchi, still with animation character designs by Shingo Araki and Michi Himeno, while the scripts were adapted from the manga this time by Michiko Yokote, and the soundtrack was entirely taken from Yokoyama's work on the previous TV series.

Two years after the first part of the Hades saga, Chapter Sanctuary, a second part was produced in 2005. This second chapter was named  and consists of six episodes, adapting volumes 23 to 25 of the manga. However, most of the original voice actors did not reprise their roles, aside from Hideyuki Tanaka as the narrator. Hirotaka Suzuoki, the original voice actor of Dragon Shiryū, died on August 6, 2006, due to lung cancer.

On the same Animax channel, Toei Animation released the first two OVAs on December 17, 2005, followed by the next two on January 21, 2006. The last pair were released on February 18, 2006. Shortly after their TV broadcasting, which lasted for 2 months, the episodes were released on DVD in 2006. This short OVA series was directed by Tomoharu Katsumata, but the other staff remained the same. Toei Animation officially announced the news on its website on July 18, 2006. Then, which contains 6 episodes in total, was released, adapting volumes 25 to 26 of the manga.

On June 28, Masami Kurumada announced on his personal blog that production on the  OVAs had begun. It was thought that the release was to be in mid-December 2007, as of the last two years with the performance of the two Inferno chapters (Zenshō and Kōshō), but no preview or released images were available as of the end of October. In November 2007, Toei Animation announced that the official release of the Elysion Chapter would be in March 2008 and not December 2007 as originally planned The Elysion OVAs were released in March (episodes #26 and #27), May (#28 and #29), and August (#30 and #31), and adapted the final two volumes of the manga, 27 and 28.

An original net animation (ONA) series titled Saint Seiya: Soul of Gold began streaming in 2015. Another ONA series, Knights of the Zodiac: Saint Seiya, premiered on Netflix, with six episodes, on July 19, 2019. Another six episodes premiered on January 23, 2020. The second season premiered on Crunchyroll on July 31, 2022.

Musicals
In August 1991, a musical, sponsored by Bandai, was performed at the Aoyama theater in Tokyo, Japan. The story retells the Sanctuary and Poseidon chapters. The cast included members of SMAP as the five Bronze Saints and Poseidon. The characters Aries Mu, Leo Aiolia, and Scorpio Milo were portrayed by members of another band, Tokio.

As of May 2011, Masami Kurumada announced in his website that a new Saint Seiya musical was in the works. Debuting in late 2011, the stage play was titled Saint Seiya Super Musical, and presented a live-action adaptation of the first Saint Seiya film, Evil Goddess Eris.

Video games

Several video games have been released based on the series.

Discography
Seiji Yokoyama was the main composer for the Saint Seiya original anime series 1986/90. A selection is listed below:
 Saint Seiya Original Soundtrack I–VIII (spanning 8 CDs)
 Saint Seiya – 1996 Song Collection
 Saint Seiya – 1997 Shonenki
 Saint Seiya – Best Collection
 Saint Seiya – Chikyūgi (Single Album)
 Saint Seiya – Galaxian Wars
 Saint Seiya – Memorial Box (spanning 5 CDs)
 Saint Seiya – Gold Collection (spanning 5 CDs)
 Saint Seiya – Hits (spanning 3 CDs)
 Saint Seiya – King of the Underworld
 Saint Seiya – Piano Fantasia
 Saint Seiya – Tenkai Hen Josō Overture
 Saint Seiya – Song Selection (commemorative CD for the 30th anniversary of the original series of Saint Seiya eighties)

Merchandise

Starting in 2002, for their popular gashapon high-quality PVC figurines line, Bandai released several Saint Seiya themed sets, each one containing an average of 5 figurines. Seven sets were released, the sixth of which was a Special release that included the 12 Gold Saints. The seventh set was released in 2004 to commemorate the release of the Tenkai Hen Josō Overture movie, raising the number of figurines released to date to 34.

In 2006, Bandai created a separate gashapon line named . It differed from the original gashapon line in that the figurines were poseable and their armor could be removed. Five sets, each containing five figurines, were released.

In 2008, Bandai released a line of PVC figurines . Each set includes an average of five figures, and four sets have been released to date.

The Japanese hobby figurine and collectible manufacturer Megahouse released in 2007 a line of very high-quality, non-poseable resin figures named Saint Seiya Excellent Model, which are part of the line Excellent Model, composed of various well-known characters from manga and anime. Three figures have been released so far, Pegasus Seiya, Dragon Shiryū and Athena.

Three volumes have been released so far, each one containing 6 figures.

Continuing with its Saint Seiya themed lines, Medicos Entertainment also released a line of non-poseable resin figures named , composed of various figures of Saint Seiya characters. Nine figures have been released so far. Medicos also released a very high-quality resin figure of Aiolos and Seiya, wearing the Sagittarius Gold Cloth, as part of their Art Collection line. All three sub-lines form part of their Chōzō (Super Figures) line.

Megahouse released of two sets of chibi PVC figures portraying the Gold Saints, titled . Both sets include seven figures; set 1 was released in July 2012, and set 2 was released in September 2012.

In 2016, D.D.Panoramation, a new line of action figures, was released, consisting of 17 characters of the original series (years 80s)(1986/1990)(12 Gold Saints and 5 Bronze Saints).

In November 2016, a new line of action figures called Saint Seiya Daizenshuu, consisting of 12 characters of the original series (years 80s)(1986\1990) Saint Seiya, in "Superdeformer" version, was released.

In 2019, a new line of action figures called Saint Seiya Revival, consisting of characters of the original series (years 80s)(1986/1990)(5 Bronze Saints and 12 Gold Saints).

Other media
In the early 1990s, Renaissance-Atlantic Entertainment planned to produce an American animated version of the series titled Guardians of the Cosmos. Only a pilot was made, and the intro was revealed at the end of YouTuber Ray Mona's documentary on the subject titled The Secret Stories of Saint Seiya in December 2022.

Many different events took place to celebrate the manga's 30th anniversary. In June 2016, there was a convention in Akihabara (Tokyo) commemorating the historic series, with numerous commemorative gadgets on sale. An official website called seiya30th was launched. A second exhibition was held in Hong Kong in September 2016. Saint Seiya 30 Shunen Keny Gashu, Seiiki - Sanctuary, an art book consisting of 130 pages illustrated by Masami Kurumada, was launched in Japan on October 21, 2016, by Takarajimash. A third exhibition was held in China (Hong Kong) in April 2018.

Reception
The Saint Seiya manga has sold over 25 million copies in Japan as of 2007. It had over 35 million copies in circulation as of 2017, and over 50 million copies in circulation as of 2022. The anime series won the Animage Anime Grand Prix prize in 1987. In Animage's 2001 "Top-100 Anime" ranking, Saint Seiya was 53rd. In 2006, TV Asahi conducted a nationwide survey for the one hundred most popular animated television series,  where Saint Seiya came in 25th place. In NHK's "Best 100 Anime" online poll ranking, celebrating a century of Japanese Animation, Saint Seiya came in 123rd place.

The series was considered one of the biggest phenomena of the 1980s. It would become the inspiration for future series, including several Gundam series such as Mobile Suit Gundam Wing and Mobile Fighter G Gundam, Legend of Heavenly Sphere Shurato, Ronin Warriors, Wild Knights Gulkeeva, and Kurumada's later work B't X. In The Anime Encyclopedia: A Guide to Japanese Animation Since 1917, Jonathan Clements and Helen McCarthy praises the series' complex plot and felt that animation designers' Shingo Araki and Michi Himeno had worked "magic" with both the anime series and the films. They also praised the grand soundtrack and director Shigeyasu Yamauchi's ability to stretch out the tension and chose the perfect places to stop an episode to keep audiences waiting for the next one. Clements and McCarthy did, however, find the series disturbing in that its main emotional impact comes from the audience seeing "older boys and men fighting brave but naive teenagers" and through victories earning more weapons. Jason Thompson describes the series as being "almost pure battle".

Yaoi dōjinshi based on Saint Seiya popularized the term "yaoi" in 1987. Saint Seiya was particularly popular as a subject in yaoi as it had a large cast which was predominantly male. This allowed "an incredible number" of pairings, although Andromeda Shun was one of the more popular characters to create yaoi for.

Tite Kubo, the author of the manga series Bleach, named Saint Seiya as one of his biggest inspirations for the designs of the different types of weapons that his characters use in the story as well as the battle scenes.

Saint Seiya: Soul of Gold (2015) drew a  viewership worldwide by September 2015.

References

Further reading

External links

  
 

Saint Seiya
1986 anime television series debuts
1986 manga
2002 anime OVAs
2002 Japanese novels
2005 anime OVAs
2008 anime OVAs
2019 anime ONAs
ADV Films
Classical mythology in anime and manga
Fantasy anime and manga
Martial arts anime and manga
Musicals based on anime and manga
Mythopoeia
Shōnen manga
Shueisha franchises
Shueisha manga
Television series by DIC Entertainment
Toei Animation television
Toonami
TV Asahi original programming
Viz Media manga